The Unified Team was the name used for the sports team of eleven former constituent republics of the Soviet Union 
(excluding Estonia, Georgia, Latvia, and Lithuania) at the 1992 Winter Paralympics in Albertville and the 1992 Summer Paralympics in Barcelona. The IOC country code was EUN, after the French name, Équipe Unifiée.

The Paralympic Flag was used in place of a national flag at the Opening Ceremony and at medals ceremonies, and the Paralympic Hymn was played for gold medallists. Unlike the Unified Team at the Olympics, the Summer Paralympic team paraded in the opening ceremony with no special procedure (no placard displayed the names of the individual countries, the announcers did not announce the names of the individual countries, and the athletes did not carry flags of the individual countries).

Details 
For details of the Unified Team's participation, see:
 Unified Team at the 1992 Winter Paralympics
 Unified Team at the 1992 Summer Paralympics

Participating countries

Performance 
The Unified Team finished third to the United States and Germany in the overall medal tally at Albertville with 10 golds, 8 silvers, and 3 bronzes; 21 medals in total
The team finished eighth at Barcelona with 16 golds, 14 silvers, and 15 bronzes; 45 medals in total
(Note, however, that the International Paralympic Committee (IPC) does not officially recognise national medal totals.)

Athletes 
Athletes competing for the Unified team at the 1992 Summer and 1992 Winter Paralympic Games.

Summer Games 
Men

 Archery
Stepan Bugaychuk 
Dmitri Nikolsky 
Konstantine Shumkov
 Athletics
Oleg Chepel 
Victor Khilmonchik  
Sergei Khodakov  
Aleksei Lashmanov  
Andrei Makarov  
Sergey Okulov  
Vladimir Potapenko  
Sergei Sevastianov  
Sergey Shilov  
Sergey Silchenco  
Yurij Zubrilov
 Cycling
Alexandre Pytko 
Nikolai Timofeev
 Goalball
Vladimir Berejetski  
Nikolai Lednev  
Alexandre Litvinov  
Alexei Pavlyguine  
Nikolai Perejoguine  
Alexandre Toupiline
 Judo
Akhmed Gazimagomedov  
Vladimir Kazakov  
Veniamin Mitchourine  
Mikhail Yakovlev
 Powerlifting
Vladimir Larionov  
Roman Omurbekov
 Swimming
Albert Bakaev  
Vladimir Chesnov  
Aleksei Kapoura   
Vitaly Khutornoy  
Vitalii Krylov  
Juri Likorovsky  
Nikolay Ponamarev   
Nikolay Rogozhin   
Vladimir Vshivtsev
 Table Tennis
Vladimir Polkanov   
Valery Vishnjakov  
Sergey Zuev
 Volleyball
Gadji Abakarov  
Igor Bondar 
A. Gontcharenko 
Victor Krasnov 
Alexander Kukatov 
Murad Makhanov 
Radjab Mamaev 
Vladimir Maysak 
Petr Ostrinsky 
Iouri Soubbota 
Peter Zubov

Women

 Archery
Tatiana Grishko
 Athletics
Rimma Batalova 
Olga Churkina   
Irina Leontiouk  
Ljubov Malakhova  
Olga Nazarenko 
Tamara Pankova  
Tamara Sivakova  
Raisa Zhuravleva
 Swimming
Olga Melnikova  
Natalia Parshina

Winter Games 
Men

 Alpine skiing
Alexey Bargojakov  
Ivan Chaprygin 
Oleg Krasavin 
Alexei Moshkine 
Oleg Vasiljev
 Biathlon
Afanasiev 
Bogdanov 
Nikolai Ilioutchenko 
Vladimir Kolesnikov 
Sergei Lozhkin 
Seleznev 
Andrei Venediktov
 Cross-country skiing
Afanasiev  
Bogdanov 
Nikolai Ilioutchenko  
Vasily Koczekin 
Vladimir Kolesnikov 
Valeriy Kupchinski 
Sergei Lozhkin 
Vasily Petrochuk 
Igor Pustovit 
Seleznev 
Andrei Venediktov 

Women

 Alpine skiing
Zinaida Emlina
 Cross-country skiing
Chirkova 
Elesina 
Nazarenko 
Lubov Paninykii

See also
Unified Team at the Olympics
Independent Paralympic Participants at the 1992 Summer Paralympics
Korean Unification Flag
CIS national football team

References

 
Nations at the Paralympics
Unified Team at multi-sport events
Sport in the Commonwealth of Independent States